Khandavideko Mamsavideko is a 1979 Indian Kannada film, directed by P. Lankesh and produced by Prabhakar Reddy, P. Lankesh, B. S. Somasundar and K. S. L. Swamy (Ravi). The film stars Jayamala, Suresh Heblikar and Roopa Chakravarthi in lead roles. The film had musical score by Rajeev Tharanath.

Cast

Jayamala
Suresh Heblikar
 Roopa Chakravarthi
Gangadhar
Sarvamangala

References

External links
 
 

1970s Kannada-language films
Films directed by P. Lankesh